The Great Flood of 1881 refers to flooding events along the Missouri River during the spring of 1881.  The flood began around Pierre, South Dakota and struck areas down river in Yankton, South Dakota, Omaha, Nebraska, Council Bluffs, Iowa, Nebraska City, Nebraska, Kansas City, Missouri and farther south between April 1, 1881 and April 27, 1881.  The events provided the first detailed reporting of Missouri River flooding, and caused millions of dollars in damage.

Events

Snowfall in the winter of 1880-81 was unusually heavy and throughout March 1881 temperatures remained extraordinarily cold.  Then during the last week in March the temperature climbed.  Melting snow in the Dakotas, north of Nebraska, poured water into the Missouri River.

John Hilger, an early resident of Pierre, South Dakota described the flood, saying, “When the snow started to disappear, it left in a hurry. The river rose very rapidly, the ice gorged a short distance below town, turning the water into the bottoms and flooded the town with from four to six feet of water. Those who were not so fortunate as to possess two story houses were obliged to retreat to higher ground. My dugout was filled with women and children and I was obliged to seek quarters elsewhere because of the lack of room.”

Omaha and Council Bluffs
Downtown Omaha was flooded up to 9th Street, and Council Bluffs was flooded the same. The river remained at a high level for several weeks and during the height of flooding was reported to have been five miles (8 km) wide. The entirety of Omaha's shipping industry was damaged, with industrial, trade and docking buildings severely damaged if not destroyed. Losses from this flood were said to be "in the millions," and in 1881 dollars that would equate to a major flood.

There were only two deaths in Omaha during the floods. A small one-man skiff was being used by three Union Pacific workers who were attempting to cross a break in a temporary dam when the river's current pushed it into the main channel. Two men jumped from the boat and drowned immediately.

The Omaha Bee covered the flood each day from April 2 through April 13.

Lake Manawa

After the flood in the area south of Council Bluffs, the Missouri River had looped itself in a hairpin bend, leaving an old channel filled with quiet water.

Nebraska City and Eastport
As the river rose efforts were made in hopes of saving the lowlands of Iowa along the Missouri River.  By April 9 the steamboat ferry Lizzie Campbell was finding it difficult to land passengers at Nebraska City as the water ran deep on the landing.  Passengers were unloaded only by cart.

By April 11 all of the Iowan lowlands were under water.

By the middle of May the river had risen to the highest point in the history of Nebraska City and Fremont County, Iowa and its course was changed considerably when the waters finally fell to normal.

Timeline
April 1
On the morning of April 1 word was received from Yankton, South Dakota that the Missouri River rose thirty-five feet, killing several people and destroying the lowlands in that area. The railroads received warnings from points north and advised people in the area to leave the river bottoms. They moved their rolling stock and equipment to higher lands throughout the area.

April 6
In the afternoon of April 6 a temporary dam around riverfront businesses in Omaha burst. During this period the Omaha Smelting Works and Union Pacific Shops almost completely submerged.

April 9
On the morning of April 9 the North Western Railroad levee bounding Council Bluffs against the river broke and water spread over the west and south sections of the city. An anonymous man rode a horse through the south part of the city to warn residents when the levee gave way. Rescue shelters were placed throughout the area, with "any building that was suitable was thrown open to the refugees."

After that event from Ninth Street in Council Bluffs west to Omaha and from Carter Lake south beyond the Union Pacific Shops looked like "a sea" dotted with houses and outbuildings like islands. Boats and large sections of wooden sidewalks were pressed into service, with the operators earning from $15 to $20 a day.

April 12
Water started receding on April 12, with railroads clearing up and repairing tracks immediately. Families returned to their homes to begin cleaning out water. However, on April 22 the river stage increased at the rate of a foot an hour, causing people again to move to higher land. This time when the river broke its banks the water spread to Eighth Street and Broadway in Council Bluffs. Houses, trees and livestock were seen floating downriver.

April 25
The Union Pacific Shops remained flooded as the river rose another two inches. A riverfront packinghouse and the Willow Springs Distilling Company were flooded, along with many smaller riverside businesses. 1,600 workers were unemployed at this point. In Council Bluffs 600 people were homeless, with more than a half of the city inundated with water. During the previous several weeks the Elkhorn River valley was flooded as well, with the entire town of Waterloo, Nebraska abandoned due to flooding.

Cleanup
The river began to recede on April 27 and families returned to their homes again. General Grenville M. Dodge, the chief engineer in charge of the construction of the Union Pacific, had employees ride through the flooded areas to rescue cattle. The river dropped  on the 27th.

See also
 Geography of Omaha
 The Long Winter (novel) Describes the events of the 1880-1881 winter that caused the Great Flood in the spring of 1881.
 Severe winter of 1880–1881

References

External links
 Flood of 1881 from the Omaha Public Library
 Historic photo
 Historic photo
  Capital Journal, THE GREAT FLOOD: Recalling the Missouri River flood and ice gorges of 1881

Natural disasters in Omaha, Nebraska
Missouri River floods
1881 floods in the United States
1881 natural disasters in the United States
1881 in Nebraska
1881 in Iowa
April 1881 events